John Cahill may refer to:

John Cahill (baseball), former Major League Baseball outfielder
John Cahill (footballer), retired Australian rules football player and coach
John Cahill (businessman), British businessman, and former Executive Chairman of British Aerospace
John Cahill (bishop), Roman Catholic Bishop of Portsmouth
John T. Cahill (lawyer), American lawyer and prosecutor
John T. Cahill (businessman), American businessman
John Joseph Cahill, Premier of New South Wales from 1952 to 1959
John Cahill (wrestler), American professional wrestler